Harry Wozniak (born 27 June 1964) is a Barbadian swimmer. He competed in three events at the 1984 Summer Olympics.

References

External links
 

1960 births
Living people
Barbadian male swimmers
Olympic swimmers of Barbados
Swimmers at the 1984 Summer Olympics
Place of birth missing (living people)